The Islanders is an American adventure drama series which aired on ABC from 1960 to 1961, starring William Reynolds, James Philbrook, and Diane Brewster.

Premise
Stated a UPI article on September 20, 1960, "Basis of the show is a one-airplane airline run by the three principals in the lush East Indies. The men are soldiers of fortune and Diane [Brewster] plays a Dutch girl attempting to regain her family’s property."

At the beginning of the series, Sandy Wade (Reynolds) and Zack Malloy (Philbrook), co-owners of a Grumman Goose amphibious aircraft, start their one-plane airline in the Moluccas or Spice Islands of the southwest Pacific Ocean. Throughout the series they experience a variety of adventures where seemingly harmless charter flights put them into danger.  They are frequently aided in their endeavours by the unusually-named Wilhelmina "Steamboat Willy" Vanderveer (Brewster) and Shipwreck Callighan (Roy Wright).

"The boys get into lots of messes," said Brewster "and things aren't helped for them by the way I play one of them against the other in whatever romantic notions they have about me."

Cast
William Reynolds as Sandy Wade
James Philbrook as Zack Malloy
Diane Brewster as Wilhelmina "Steamboat Willy" Vanderveer

Episodes

Filming
William Reynolds stated in an interview, "The series went from being sort of like a Terry and the Pirates or a Maverick type of concept to becoming just a bunch of people skulking around. It wasn't very good."

"We have a show that has all the meat and potatoes," said Reynolds during filming. "All it lacks is the gravy... we may be trying to place too much in a small screen."

Accident
In February 1960 a plane carrying five crew members from Montego Bay to Miami crashed off the coast of Jamaica into the water. The men were Reynolds, Bare, Glenn Kirkpatrick, pilot Howard Smith and camera man George Schmidt. All but Schmidt were picked out of the water.

Broadcast
The Islanders, primarily sponsored by Liggett & Myers' Chesterfield cigarettes, aired at 9:30 Eastern time on Sunday evenings opposite The Jack Benny Program and Candid Camera on CBS and the second half of The Dinah Shore Show and the last season of The Loretta Young Show on NBC.

Reception
The Los Angeles Times said the show was like many other adventure series on ABC at the time (Hong Kong, Surfside 6, Hawaiian Eye) and said "it did achieve a certain flavour with its tropical background" adding "if the series scores at all - and it does show some promise - it will largely be due to Reynolds."

Legacy
After The Islanders, Philbrook co-starred in the 1962–1963 season as a magazine publisher and the love interest of Loretta Young in her short-lived The New Loretta Young Show, which aired Mondays on CBS. Reynolds went on to star in two other ABC series, The Gallant Men, a World War II series, and The FBI with Efrem Zimbalist, Jr.

Diane Brewster had earlier portrayed gambler "Samantha Crawford" in the first two seasons of Maverick (1957) and appeared in 1957–1958 in the first season of Leave It to Beaver as schoolteacher "Miss Canfield," later replaced by Sue Randall as "Miss Landers."  Subsequently, in the 1960s, as a favor to writer/producer Roy Huggins, Brewster occasionally portrayed without screen credit the murdered wife "Helen Kimble" (in flashbacks) in ABC's The Fugitive.

Guest stars

Aki Aleong
Anna-Lisa
Charles Bickford
Charles Bronson
Walter Burke
Sebastian Cabot
Anthony Caruso
Hans Conried
Elisha Cook, Jr.
Norma Crane
Christopher Dark
Frank DeKova
Peter Falk
Betty Garde
Myron Healey
James Hong
Robin Hughes
Sam Jaffe
Werner Klemperer
Martin Landau
Suzanne Lloyd
George Macready
E.G. Marshall
Murray Matheson
Nobu McCarthy
Sean McClory
Darren McGavin
Jan Merlin 
Leslie Nielsen
Jay Novello
Joan O'Brien
J. Pat O'Malley
Leo Penn
Gigi Perreau
Suzanne Pleshette
Gena Rowlands
Gia Scala
Robert J. Stevenson
Harold J. Stone
 George Takei
Luther Adler
Gloria Talbott
Harry Townes
Grace Lee Whitney
Peter Whitney
Adam Williams
Fay Wray
Keenan Wynn

References

External links 
 

American Broadcasting Company original programming
1960 American television series debuts
1961 American television series endings
Aviation television series
Black-and-white American television shows
Indonesia in fiction
Television series by MGM Television